The Journal of Psychosomatic Research is the official medical journal of the European Association of Psychosomatic Medicine and is affiliated with the International College of Psychosomatic Medicine.

External links 
 
 International College of Psychosomatic Medicine

Psychosomatic medicine journals
English-language journals
Elsevier academic journals
Publications established in 1956
Monthly journals